George Marshall McCall Smith (1882–1958) was a Scottish medical doctor, medical superintendent and community leader in New Zealand. He was born in Nairn, Scotland in 1882, emigrating to New Zealand in 1914. For 34 years he ran Rawene Hospital, campaigned for  state funding of health and created a health service for the Hokianga area.

Early life 

George McCall Smith was born in Nairn, Scotland on 13 November 1882. He completed his medical degree at the University of Edinburgh, and then went into general practice in Strathmiglo, Fife and Perth. In 1907 he married Barbara Grieve with whom he had two sons and two daughters. He emigrated to Rawene in New Zealand in 1914 with one of his patients, Lucy Scott.

Career 
Smith and Lucy Scott arrived in Rawene in September 1914. It was a remote community in the Hokianga, the population was impoverished and 60% Māori. Smith was appointed Surgeon Superintendent at Rawene Hospital for which he was paid £300 a year. He trained Lucy to be his anaesthetist. Some years later Lucy's qualifications and ability to be an anaesthetist were questioned but the local Hospital Board considered that she was qualified by her experience.

In 1921 the Hokianga County Council, which ran the Hospital Board, introduced cost-cutting measures which included terminating Smith and Lucy's employment and readvertising Smith's job at £100 a year. The Council's decision may have been related to some Council members finding Smith troublesome or his personal affairs. Smith's divorce was widely reported in British and New Zealand newspapers. Some of the community were shocked by the fact that Smith and Lucy were unmarried when they arrived in Rawene, though they were subsequently married. The community rallied in support of Smith, presenting a 750 signature petition to the Board, and he was reappointed at his original salary.

Rawene Hospital and Hokianga Special Area 
The Health Department required all hospitals to have special isolation beds for infectious diseases cases, in particular tuberculosis (TB). Smith raised money from the community and in 1915 he closed in the hospital verandah and increased the number of hospital beds, even though he had no intention of treating infectious diseases patients in his hospital. By the following year it was clear that the hospital resources were inadequate and in 1920, although some facilities had been improved, he began lobbying for a better water supply. After the divorce matter and local body elections Smith set about planning a new hospital. In 1925 the Health Department approved the plans for a new hospital and Smith raised money from the community to furnish and equip it. To raise funds he implemented an unofficial 'hut tax' over every dwelling in the county, ran an illegal casino in Rawene and an illegal raffle. The new hospital was built on time and within budget and was opened by the Minister of Health in March 1928.

In the 1930s Smith was advocating for state funded medical care. The election of the Labour government in 1935 with its policy of a state medical service was an opportunity for Smith to promote his views. He saw that doctors had financial objectives, many patients were unable to pay for treatment and that a solution was for all doctors to be on salaries. He outlined his views in his first book Notes from a backblock hospital in 1938.

In 1939 Smith lobbied the government for the Hokianga to be given a special area status. Under this scheme all doctors, in the hospital and community, would be paid salaries by the Hospital Board. Consultations, pharmaceuticals, investigations and hospital admissions would be free. Hospital and domiciliary services would be combined, nurses would be employed by the Health Department, and clinics established in the various districts. After delays, partly due to the war, opposition from the medical profession and protracted negotiations with the government, the Hokianga Special Area was set up in September 1941.

Medical practice 
In the early 1930s Smith began to practice twilight sleep for women in childbirth using Nembutal and hyoscine (Scopolamine). A government Commission of Inquiry into Maternity Services in 1937 included an investigation of anaesthetic practices. The Commission examined Smith's practice, noting Smith had made a special study of painless childbirth, and found his results could not be bettered. The Commission recorded 108 maternity cases at Rawene in the year (including 36 Māori), but only seven maternity beds. Most Māori women gave birth at home and the hospital was unable to cater for more women wanting to give birth there. The Commission recommended an increase in maternity beds, staff and equipment to cater for more Māori cases. In 1948 a newspaper reported that women were flocking to Rawene Hospital to give birth because it offered painless childbirth.

Smith practised some unconventional cures: using cod liver oil and vaseline on dressings to give a non-stick covering, wrapping simple fractures in newspaper casts which could be easily removed, inventing a 'black box' which was placed over the head of anaesthetised patients to raise , refuting the need to eat green vegetables, rejection of circumcision, and encouraging schools to serve sheep-head broth to the children. During World War II, with the threat of a Japanese invasion, Smith stockpiled medical supplies, seriously depleting the nation's supplies.

During the 1918 flu epidemic Smith ordered the police to prevent visitors from entering the area, in an attempt to stop the spread of the disease. In 1933 an epidemic of a febrile illness broke out in Rawene and Smith ordered all shops and schools to be closed, assisted by the police. The Medical Officer of Health for Northland was unwilling to set in place similar restrictions in nearby Kaikohe. However, in order to prevent the spread of the disease Smith succeeded in stopping a visit of the spiritual leader Ratana and his followers. Smith's management of TB cases was called into question in 1946 when patients died in their own homes, putting other family members at risk. Smith always maintained that treating TB cases in sanatoria was ineffective and that the incidence of TB would be reduced by improving living standards, particularly diet and housing, and using effective drug treatment. In 1948 during the polio epidemic Smith demanded that the Northland Medical Officer of Health, James Newman, use his authority to close schools and shops to prevent the disease from spreading. Newman refused on the grounds that widespread closure of schools was not effective in dealing with the epidemic, and school teachers and shopkeepers also refused to take orders from Smith.

In 1948 following a committee of inquiry into the death of a child in his care, Smith and Lucy resigned even though the committee's report cleared Smith of wrongdoing. They moved to Waikanae, near their daughter Janet, where Smith set up in private practice.

Other activities 
Smith and Lucy purchased land for a farm near Horeke in 1920. He organised, and was chair of, a local branch of the Farmer's Union. The farming venture was unsuccessful and the land was later leased and then sold to the government. He recognised the need for local people to have an income and promoted growing tobacco as a cash crop, however the scheme was a failure.

Smith was a convert to Social Credit policies and began a Hokianga party branch, later becoming president of New Zealand Social Credit. He advocated for a special currency as a solution to unemployment.

Personal life 

Smith and Lucy had two children, Jock and Janet. Jock died in 1932. Janet completed five years at Otago Medical School in Dunedin but left to get married, much to her father's displeasure. He did not attend her wedding to Peter Irwin, an Air Force officer, and she was given away by Sir Douglas Robb. She later completed her medical degree in 1963 and practised in New Zealand and Australia in the area of child, student and women's health. She was a health and social activist and died in 2009.

The writer Alexander McCall Smith, Smith's grandson, visited Rawene Hospital in 2014.

Legacy 
George McCall Smith "began ahead of his time yet ended up overtaken by new developments. Eventually he paid the price of professional isolation. His single-mindedness gave him the strength to succeed, yet in the end ironically, it contributed to his eventual loss of self-confidence and consequent resignation".

Smith was not only a doctor but also a campaigner. He promoted the need for adequate income, diet and housing, and campaigned for a health service which was free at the point of need. He was responsible for creating a co-operative medical service and the Hokianga Special Area integrating medical and nursing services as well as hospital and community services, laying the foundation for the health service in the Hokianga.

Publications 
 The education of the Maori: (report of a lecture given at Kaikohe to the Native School Teachers' Association) (1921)
 Notes from a backblock hospital (1938)
 Nurses in a co-operative clinic medical service / address delivered by G.M. Smith before the Bay of Islands Branch of the Registered Nurses Association (1938?)
 More notes from a backblock hospital (1941)
 End of the era of murder medicine (1941)
 Medical advice from a backblock hospital (1942)
 Maori rehabilitation / an address given by G.M. Smith before a meeting of the members of the Native Schools Branch, N.Z.E.I., at Kaikohe, October 2, 1943 (1943)
 Plans, plots and appraisals from the backblocks (1945)
Later notes from a backblocks hospital (1949)

Further reading 
 Ancott-Johnson, Barbara (1973) Nurse in the North: with Dr. G.M. Smith in the Hokianga. Christchurch: Whitcombe and Tombs. 
 Kemble Welch, Graham. Hokianga Revisited 1997
Williams, Christine (2010) Hokianga Health - the First Hundred Years - Te Rautau Tuatahi. Whangarei: Hokianga Health Enterprise Trust. 
 Dr George McCall Smith 1882–1958. Hokianga Health.

External links 
 Olivia Spencer Bower's paintings and drawings of Smith and the Hokianga can be found in the Alexander Turnbull Library, Te Papa and the Christchurch Art Gallery e.g.
 Dr Smith off to buy meat 
 Rawene Mothers
 Hokianga 
 Dr Smith at Rawene
 Weekly Review no. 331 - Hokianga - Backblock Medical Service (1948) Film which looks at the delivery of health services to the Hokianga district. The film score was composed by Douglas Lilburn.

References

Citations

Bibliography 

1882 births
1958 deaths
20th-century New Zealand medical doctors
Scottish emigrants to New Zealand
New Zealand medical administrators